

Results

Titles
Miss Tel-Aviv – Michal Avrahami
Miss Haifa – Mali Melech
Miss South – Edna Gonen
Miss Jerusalem – Rachel Tzur

External links

1975 beauty pageants
1975 in Israel
Miss Israel